"Silence Is Easy" is the first single from the album of the same name by British pop band Starsailor. The song reached number nine on the UK Singles Chart, which is the band's highest position on the UK chart. The song also reached number 40 in Ireland and number 70 in the Netherlands. It was one of two songs on the album that was produced by Phil Spector.

Music video

The video takes place in a nightclub. Walsh walks through the middle of a crowd of people with a stoic expression on his face which only changes when he is singing. While he's walking the people around him have varying attitudes: some seem to love him and others clearly dislike him. A man puts his hands on James and screams at his face, which contrasts with a Japanese girl who is so happy after watching him that it makes her cry. There are also some boys that clap him on the back to encourage him, a woman with a wedding dress and a transgender person who tries to kiss him.

Track listings

UK, European, and Australian CD single
 "Silence Is Easy"
 "Could You Be Mine?"
 "She Understands"

UK and European limited-edition 7-inch single
A. "Silence Is Easy"
B. "She Understands"

UK DVD single
 "Silence Is Easy" (video)
 Behind the scenes interview
 "Could You Be Mine?" (audio)
 "Good Souls" (live 2003)

Credits and personnel
Credits are lifted from the UK CD single liner notes.

Studio
 Mastered at Sterling Sound (New York City)

Personnel

 Starsailor – writing
 Ruth Gottlieb – violin
 Gillon Cameron – violin
 Rob Spriggs – viola
 Sarah Wilson – cello
 Phil Spector – production

 Danton Supple – engineering
 Michael H. Brauer – mixing
 Nathaniel Chan – mixing assistant
 Greg Calbi – mastering
 Yacht Associates – art direction
 Rick Guest – photography

Charts

Release history

References

2003 singles
2003 songs
Capitol Records singles
EMI Records singles
Song recordings produced by Phil Spector
Songs written by Barry Westhead
Songs written by Ben Byrne
Songs written by James Stelfox
Songs written by James Walsh (musician)
Starsailor (band) songs